Laides is a genus of catfish in the family Ailiidae native to Asia. These species are originates from Mekong and Chao Phraya River basins.

Species
There are currently two recognized species in this genus:
Laides hexanema (Bleeker, 1852)
Laides longibarbis (Fowler, 1934)

References

Fish of Thailand
Fish of Indonesia
Catfish genera
Taxa named by David Starr Jordan
Freshwater fish genera